The Renault Z.E. (Z.E. stands for Zero Emission) is a line of all-electric cars from Renault. The line began with the Z.E series of concept cars. The first production car is the Renault Fluence Z.E. that was slated for sales to the public in Israel and Denmark by late 2011 as part of the Better Place network, operated by Renault Fluence ZE cars. In 2011 Renault was awarded a contract to supply 15,600 electric vehicles to the French government and the state-owned postal service, La Poste. The vehicles are to contribute to a planned 25,000 electric vehicle fleet owned by the French government.

The Z.E. branding is also used for Renault Trucks's electric models, despite being a separate company.

Global Renault Z.E. vehicle sales passed the 100,000 unit milestone in September 2016. The Renault Zoe is the ZE top selling model, and global sales of the electric city car achieved the 150,000 unit milestone in June 2019.

In 2021 the Z.E. brand was phased out with existing Z.E. models rebranded as E-Tech Electric.

Concept cars

2008 Paris Motor Show
The first model in the Z.E. project was a concept based on the Renault Kangoo Be Bop. It debuted at the 2008 Paris Motor Show

It has its compact dimensions (length: , height: . Solar panels positioned on the roof power a temperature regulation system.

Estimated price is 16,000 €.

2009 Frankfurt Motor Show
In 2009 at the Frankfurt Motor Show, Renault extended the concept from one model to four:
 Fluence Z.E. five-seat saloon which implements Renault's "Quickdrop" rapid battery exchange system that is compatible with Better Place's electric vehicle network
 Kangoo Z.E. van
 Twizy Z.E. ultra-compact city car
 Zoe Z.E. supermini

Renault announced that cars "previewed" by all four Z.E. concept vehicles would be released from 2011 onwards and cater for a wide variety of different customers and uses.

2010 Paris Motor Show

At the 2010 Paris Motor Show Renault showed the "Zoe Preview", promoting it as "a realistic glimpse of the forthcoming mass-market Renault electric car... a near-definitive representation (90 per cent) of the vehicle that will be manufactured at Renault's Flins plant, France. Its launch is scheduled for mid-2012."
The show car supports the same QuickDrop battery swap capability as the Fluence Z.E., and DC fast charging.

Renault also showed several updated Twizy models 
and announced the Kangoo Express Z.E. van "will go on sale from mid-2011 for between €15,000 excluding VAT (with tax incentive of 5,000 euros deducted, and without options, in France) and €20,000 excluding VAT (without tax incentive, and without options), depending on the country."

Production models 

In 2010 Renault announced details of the first vehicles intended for production in 2011, the Fluence Z.E. and Kangoo Z.E. models.
Customers in several countries can pre-reserve models at the Renault-ZE web site, although as of April 2010 it has no pricing details.

Renault announced the city car previewed by Zoé Z.E. Concept will be produced in Flins in France, and the vehicle based on Twizy. Concept will be built in Valladolid in Spain.

Renault will initially purchase batteries from AESC, the Nissan-NEC joint venture in Japan.
It announced development of battery production facilities in France, Japan,  Portugal, UK, and the USA. The Mégane Z.E., a hatchback version of the Fluence Z.E., is also in development.

Renault global all-electric Z.E. vehicle sales passed the 100,000 unit milestone in September 2016. The Renault Zoe is the ZE top selling model, and global sales of the electric city car achieved the 50,000 unit milestone in June 2016, including both the passenger and cargo variants.

In November 2017, a new electric-car-share project was kicked off in Haifa, Israel. The project features 100 public Renault Zoe cars with its own parking spaces scattered around Haifa, operated by a smart card.

 Renault Twizy
 Renault Fluence Z.E / Renault Samsung SM3 Z.E
 Renault Kangoo Z.E
 Renault Kangoo Z.E Hydrogen
 Renault Zoe
 Renault Master Z.E
 Renault Master Z.E Hydrogen
 Renault City K-ZE
 Renault Twingo Z.E.
 Renault Trucks D Z.E.

See also 
 Renault EZ
Renault Eolab

References

External links

 Renault Z.E. - Zero Emission Car
 Renault-Nissan CEO Carlos Ghosn: In “A Few Years” Electric Cars Will Have “Three To Four Times More Range”

Renault
Production electric cars
Z.E. project